Redia or redia may refer to:
A synonym for the plant genus Cleidion, of the family Euphorbiaceae
A stage in the development of a trematode
A dipstick for urinalysis, determining levels of glucose, albumin and erythrocytes
An Italian zoological journal, named after Francesco Redi, started in 1903 and currently published by the Research Centre for Agrobiology and Pedology (ABP) of the Agricultural Research Council (CRA)